Elections to Daventry District Council were held on 10 June 2004. One third of the council was up for election and the Conservative Party stayed in overall control of the council.

After the election, the composition of the council was:
Conservative 34
Labour 3
Liberal Democrat 1

Election result

Ward results

References
2004 Daventry election result
Ward results

2004 English local elections
2004
2000s in Northamptonshire